Plays and Sings the Blues may refer to:

Plays and Sings the Blues, album by John Lee Hooker
Plays and Sings the Blues, album by David Isberg and Dubplate Connection 2009